Sam Swope is an author and the 2006 Thurber House children's writer in residence.

Works by Swope include I Am a Pencil: A Teacher, His Kids, and Their World of Stories, a memoir recounting three years Swope spent teaching writing students at a Queens, New York, public school.

I Am a Pencil won a 2005 Christopher Award, a Books for a Better Life Award, The Bechtel Prize, and was "named one of the best books of 2004 by Publishers Weekly."

Swope has reviewed books for the New York Times.

Books
I Am a Pencil: A Teacher, His Kids, and Their World of Stories; 
The Araboolies of Liberty Street; 
The Krazees; 
Gotta Go! Gotta Go!; 
Jack and the Seven Deadly Giants;

References

Place of birth missing (living people)
Year of birth missing (living people)
Living people
American children's writers